Kyrylo Serhiyovych Senko (born 19 November 2002) is a Ukrainian professional footballer who plays as a left winger for Ukrainian club Kolos Kovalivka.

References

External links
 Profile on Kolos Kovalivka official website
 
 

2002 births
Living people
Footballers from Kyiv
Ukrainian footballers
Association football forwards
FC Kolos Kovalivka players
Ukrainian Premier League players